East Wilson is a hamlet in the town of Wilson in Niagara County, New York, United States.
The hamlet was formerly called "Beebe's Corners"

References

Hamlets in New York (state)
Hamlets in Niagara County, New York